Dick Dent Bird Sanctuary is a  reserve in Strand, South Africa.

This isolated bird sanctuary is located near the estuary of the Lourens River. It used to be the site of a waste water treatment works but is now protected within the Lourens River Protected Natural Environment. It is managed by the nearby Helderberg Nature Reserve with help from the Somerset West Bird Club, and it is now a habitat for a great many water birds.

See also
 Biodiversity of Cape Town
 List of nature reserves in Cape Town
 Cape Lowland Freshwater Wetland

References

Nature reserves in Cape Town
Protected areas of the Western Cape